The following is a list of Michigan State Historic Sites in Cass County, Michigan. Sites marked with a dagger (†) are also listed on the National Register of Historic Places in Cass County, Michigan.



Current listings

See also
 National Register of Historic Places listings in Cass County, Michigan

Sources
 Historic Sites Online – Cass County. Michigan State Housing Developmental Authority. Accessed January 23, 2011.

References

Cass County
State Historic Sites
Tourist attractions in Cass County, Michigan